Parrhasius orgia, the variable hairstreak, is a butterfly in the family Lycaenidae. It is found from Mexico to Venezuela, the Amazon, French Guiana, Colombia and Bolivia.

References

Butterflies described in 1867
Eumaeini
Lycaenidae of South America
Butterflies of Central America
Butterflies of North America
Taxa named by William Chapman Hewitson